William Hodsoll (1718; christened 28 October 1718 at Ash-next-Ridley, Kent – 30 November 1776 at Ash-next-Ridley), was a noted English cricketer of the mid-Georgian period.  Hodsoll lived at Dartford for some years and was a tanner.

According to the description of him in Cricket, An Heroic Poem (1745) by James Love, Hodsoll was a fast (underarm) bowler and also a useful batsman.  This poem was written to commemorate the famous match between Kent and All-England at the Artillery Ground in 1744, in which Hodsoll played for Kent.

Hodsoll's last recorded appearance was for Dartford v All-England on Dartford Brent on Wed 29 July 1752.

References

English cricketers
English cricketers of 1701 to 1786
Kent cricketers
1718 births
1776 deaths
Non-international England cricketers